Renzo Calegari (5 September 1933 – 5 November 2017) was an Italian comics artist.

Life and career 
Born in Genoa, Calegari left his studies in accountancy to enter the art studios of Roy d'Ami. He made his professional debut one year later, collaborating with Gian Luigi Bonelli in the series El Kid, I Tre Bill, and in 1955 Davy Crockett. In 1957 he began a fruitful collaboration with Fleetway Publications, in which he specialized in drawing war comics.  

In 1967 he co-created with Gino D'Antonio his best known work, the long-lasting comic book series Storia del West, which ran until 1980, and for which he illustrated numerous stories. After several years of hiatus, he reprised his activities in the second half of the 1970s, collaborating with the magazines Skorpio, Il Giornalino, Orient Express and Zodiaco.

References

External links
 Renzo Calegari at Lambiek

1933 births
2017 deaths
Artists from Genoa
Italian comics artists